Barnby Moor is a civil parish in the Bassetlaw District of Nottinghamshire, England.  The parish contains three listed buildings that are recorded in the National Heritage List for England.   All the listed buildings are designated at Grade II, the lowest of the three grades, which is applied to "buildings of national importance and special interest".  The parish contains the village of Barnby Moor and the surrounding area.  All the listed buildings are near the centre of the village, and consist of two houses and a public house.


Buildings

References

Citations

Sources

 

Lists of listed buildings in Nottinghamshire